Josef Fiala (Joseph Fiala) (3 February 1748 – 31 July 1816), was a Czech composer, oboist, viola da gamba virtuoso, cellist, and pedagogue of the Classical period.

Life
He was born in Lochovice in Bohemia and began his musical career there as an oboist in the service of Countess Valpruga Netolická. The countess supported his studies of oboe with Jan Šťastný in Prague. He also studied violoncello and viola da gamba with František Josef Werner. In 1774 he left to Bavaria to play the oboe in the orchestra of Count Ernst Kraft von Oettingen-Wallerstein. In 1777 he moved to Munich to serve in the court orchestra of Elector Maximilian Joseph. Here he married Josefina Procházková, a daughter of his colleague from the orchestra, horn player Matyáš Procházka. That year in Munich, Wolfgang Amadeus Mozart befriended Fiala and was greatly impressed by his compositions. After the death of the Elector in 1778 Mozart helped him secure a position in Salzburg.

From 1778 to 1785 Fiala lived in Mozart's birth house at Getreidegasse no.9 in Salzburg. He was an oboist for archbishop Hieronymus von Colloredo's orchestra and played violin and violoncello in Salzburg State Theatre. In 1785 Fiala moved to Vienna, where he served as a horn player for Nikolaus II, Prince Esterházy, and in 1786 to Saint Petersburg where he worked in the court of Catherine the Great. After his return from Russia, he toured over Europe playing his own compositions. In 1790 he played viola da gamba for King Friedrich Wilhelm II. Finally in 1792 he became Kapellmeister, cellist and composer for Joseph Maria, Prince of Fürstenberg in Donaueschingen, where he spent the rest of his life.

Works

Concertos
 Concerto for Violin, Oboe, Viola and Violoncello
 Concerto for 2 Oboes
 Concerto for English Horn and Clarinet in B flat Major
 Concerto for 2 French Horns in E-flat major
 Concerto for Violoncello in G major
 Concerto for Flute in D major
 Concerto for Oboe in B-flat major
 Concerto for English Horn E-flat major
 Concerto for English Horn and Orchestra in C major
 Concerto for Bassoon in C major
 Concerto for Trumpet in G minor

Chamber music
 30 works pro 5–10 wind instruments
 24 quartets
 10 trios
 7 pieces for violin and violoncello
 3 pieces for violoncello and contrabass
 1 piece for 2 flutes
 2 pieces for flute or oboe and bassoon
 2 pieces for oboe and violin
 2 pieces for oboe and viola

Other
 10 symphonies
 Rondo for harpsichord and violin
 2 sonatas for harpsichord
 12 German Dances for Harpsichord
 Masses
 Ave Maria

Legacy
During Fiala's tenure in the court of Friedrich Wilhelm II, the king honored Josef by giving him his own family crest.

References

Further reading
 J.F. Reichardt: Forsetzung der Berichtigungen und Zusätze zum Gerberschen Lexikon der Tonkünstler u.s.w., in Musikalische Monathsschrift (1792) (Berlin, 1973)
 L. Schiedermair: Die Blütezeit der Öttingen-Wallerstein'schen Hofkapelle (1966)
 E. Hintermaier: Die Salzburger Hofkapelle von 1700 bis 1806, p. 112-16 (Salzburg University, 1972)
 J.R. Piersol: The Oettingen-Wallerstein Hofkapelle and its Wind Music, p. 374-403 (University of Iowa, 1972)
 François-Joseph Fétis: Biographie universelle des musiciens, t. 3-4, Paris, Firmin-Didot, 1861, p. 243-4.

External links
 

1748 births
1816 deaths
Czech classical composers
Czech male classical composers
Czech classical oboists
Male oboists
People from Beroun District